Francesco Musso (born 22 August 1937) is a retired featherweight boxer, who won a gold medal at the 1960 Olympics in Rome. The same year he turned professional and retired in 1966, with a record of 24 wins and 4 losses.  He never fought for a major title, and never fought outside of Europe.

References

1937 births
Sportspeople from Bouches-du-Rhône
Olympic boxers of Italy
Featherweight boxers
Olympic gold medalists for Italy
Boxers at the 1960 Summer Olympics
Living people
Olympic medalists in boxing
Italian male boxers
Medalists at the 1960 Summer Olympics
20th-century Italian people